Puma Air (Puma Linhas Aéreas) was a Brazilian airline founded in 2002. In August 2011 it ceased operations.

History
The airline was founded on January 21, 2002, with a fleet of 3 Cessna 208B Grand Caravan and serving 12 cities in the state of Pará. Originally a charter and air taxi operator, later it started to operate also scheduled flights.

After a period of expansion and becoming an important regional carrier on the Amazon region, Puma Air, under severe economical difficulties, grounded its aircraft and interrupted all services in February 2009. It was then sold and re-organized.

The new share-holders composition was approved by ANAC in January 2010: 80% of the shares belong to the Brazilian company Ipiranga Obras Públicas e Privadas and to Gleison Gamboni e Souza, and 20% of the shares belong to the Angolan company Angola Air Services. Puma Air restarted its operations on April 12, 2010, with flights from Belém to Macapá and São Paulo, after being grounded between January and March 2010. Puma Air does not restrict its services anymore to the Amazon region.

The airline planned to end the year 2010 with three Boeing 737-300s and to start operating a flight between Recife and Luanda, using a Boeing 767-300ER wet-leased from Gol Airlines with Varig colors. On August 23, 2010, the National Civil Aviation Agency of Brazil (ANAC) designated Puma Air to operate 4 weekly flights on the route. However, in July 2011 those plans were still not implemented.

After being grounded since August 16, 2011, the airline lost its operational license on July 23, 2013.

Destinations

Puma Air served the following cities:

Fleet
As of September 2011 the fleet of Puma Air included the following aircraft:

See also
List of defunct airlines of Brazil

References

External links

Angola Air Services
Puma Air Photo Archive at airliners.net

Defunct airlines of Brazil
Airlines established in 2002
Airlines disestablished in 2011